Nawab Muhammad Taimur Talpur is a Pakistani politician who is a Member of the Provincial Assembly of Sindh, since May 2008 to present. He is presently provincial Minister for Information Science and Technology department, Sindh.

Early life and education

He was born on 25 July 1979 in Karachi.

He has a degree of Bachelor of Business Administration and a degree of Master of Business Administration in International Management.

Political career

He was elected to the Provincial Assembly of Sindh as a candidate of Pakistan Peoples Party (PPP) from Constituency PS-68 UMERKOT-I in 2013 Pakistani general election.

He was re-elected to Provincial Assembly of Sindh as a candidate of PPP from Constituency PS-53 (Umerkot-III) in 2018 Pakistani general election.

On 15 October 2018, he was inducted into the provincial Sindh cabinet of Chief Minister Syed Murad Ali Shah and was appointed as Provincial Minister of Sindh for information science and technology with the additional ministerial portfolio of  environment climate change and coastal development.

References

Living people
Sindh MPAs 2013–2018
1979 births
Pakistan People's Party MPAs (Sindh)
Sindh MPAs 2018–2023